Tryptic soy broth or Trypticase soy broth (frequently abbreviated as TSB) is used in microbiology laboratories as a culture broth to grow aerobic bacteria. It is a complex, general purpose medium that is routinely used to grow certain pathogenic bacteria, which tend to have high nutritional requirements (i.e., they are fastidious). Its agar counterpart is tryptic soy agar (TSA). One of the components of Tryptic soy broth is Phytone , which is an enzymatic digest of soybean meal.

TSB is frequently used in commercial diagnostics in conjunction with the additive sodium thioglycolate which promotes growth of anaerobes.

Preparation 

To prepare 1 liter of TSB, the following ingredients are dissolved under gentle heat. Adjustments to pH should be made using 1N HCl or 1N NaOH to reach a final target pH of 7.3 ± 0.2 at 25 °C (77 °F).

  of Trypticase peptone (Tryptone)
  of Phytone peptone (Soytone)
  of Sodium Chloride (NaCl)
  of dipotassium phosphate (K2HPO4)
  of dextrose (glucose)
  with distilled water

References

Microbiological media